Benjamin Cudworth Yancey Jr. (April 27, 1817 – October 24, 1891) was an American politician, lawyer, officer in the Confederate States Army during the American Civil War and diplomat.

Background
Yancey, the brother of a leading Fire-Eater William Lowndes Yancey, was born in Charleston, South Carolina in 1817. He attended Franklin College (now known as the Franklin College of Arts and Sciences), the founding school of the University of Georgia in Athens, was a member of the Phi Kappa Literary Society and graduated with a Bachelor of Arts (A.B.) degree in 1836. He also attended Harvard Law School where he graduated with a Bachelor of Law (B.L.).

Political and diplomatic career 
From 1846 to 1849, he was elected to the South Carolina General Assembly House of Representatives for the Edgefield District and served one term. He also practiced law in Hamburg, South Carolina at that time. He moved to Cherokee County, Alabama, and was elected to the Alabama Senate in 1855, serving as the president of that body from 1855 to 1856. He was Minister Resident to Argentina in 1858. During the Civil War, he was a major in Cobb's Legion. He participated in the Virginia campaign, but was subsequently transferred, as colonel, to Georgia in command of state troops.

For twenty years he owned a slave who eventually went by the name of Robert Webster, the son of Daniel Webster. He allowed Robert Webster to work in Atlanta during the Civil War, where Webster did quite well financially. After the war, Yancey lost his property and borrowed money from his former slave.

In 1867, Yancey was elected president of the Alabama State Agricultural society, and he served as a trustee of the University of Georgia from 1860 to 1889. In 1875, Yancey was elected to the Georgia House of Representatives as a representative of Clarke County until 1879. He died in 1891.

Family 
Yancey married twice, first to Laura Hines and second to Sarah Paris Hamilton.

References

External links
Centennial Alumni Catalog, Hargrett Rare Books & Manuscripts Library, University of Georgia
History of the University of Georgia, Thomas Walter Reed,  Imprint:  Athens, Georgia : University of Georgia, ca. 1949, pp.388-390
Political Graveyard entry for Benjamin Cudworth Yancy
The Civil War: Diaries & Collected Papers, Middle Tennessee State University
U.S. Department of State info for Ambassadorship to Yancy
Cobb's Legion: Cavalry Battalion
Virginians: The Family History of John W. Pritchett

1817 births
1891 deaths
Members of the South Carolina House of Representatives
Alabama state senators
Members of the Georgia House of Representatives
Confederate States Army officers
Georgia (U.S. state) lawyers
University of Georgia alumni
Harvard Law School alumni
People of Georgia (U.S. state) in the American Civil War
19th-century American diplomats
Ambassadors of the United States to Argentina
19th-century American politicians
Politicians from Charleston, South Carolina
People from Hamburg, South Carolina
People from Cherokee County, Alabama
Lawyers from Charleston, South Carolina
Military personnel from Charleston, South Carolina
19th-century American lawyers